The Ramsay family is a fictional family from the Australian soap opera Neighbours. The family were one of three central families created by Reg Watson and introduced in the first episode of Neighbours in March 1985. Watson wanted the Ramsays to be humorous and rougher than the Robinson family. Ramsay Street, a cul-de-sac which is the central setting of the series, is named after the family. In 2001, the last Ramsay, Madge (Anne Charleston), departed the series. Eight years later, a new generation of the Ramsay family was introduced.

Creation and development
The Ramsay family were one of three central families introduced to viewers when Neighbours began in 1985, created by the show's creator and executive producer Reg Watson. Unlike the Robinsons, Watson wanted "humour and likeable roughness" with the Ramsay family. Josephine Monroe, author of The Neighbours Programme Guide, wrote "The Ramsays are the royal family of Neighbours and their claim on Erinsborough goes back generations." The family originally consisted of Max Ramsay (Francis Bell), his wife Maria Ramsay (Dasha Blahova), and their two sons Shane Ramsay (Peter O'Brien) and Danny Ramsay (David Clencie). The family lived at No. 24 Ramsay Street, one of the original three houses on Neighbours.

The family were friendly with the Robinsons, but tension briefly developed between the two families when Jim Robinson (Alan Dale) began dating Maria's sister Anna Rossi (Roslyn Gentle). Maria was the first member of the family to leave the show, with Danny and Max following shortly after. The producers then decided to introduce some new Ramsays in the form of Max's sister Madge Mitchell (Anne Charleston) and their brother Tom Ramsay (Gary Files), who took over Max's planned storylines. Shane's departure made way for Madge's children Charlene Mitchell (Kylie Minogue) and Henry Ramsay (Craig McLachlan), who arrived in 1986 and 1987 respectively. Charlene's romance with Scott Robinson (Jason Donovan) had become popular with Neighbours viewers, who dubbed them "TV's Romeo and Juliet" because they were from feuding families. Their wedding in "Episode 523" famously united the Ramsay and Robinson families. In 2001, Madge, the last remaining Ramsay on the street, died, after Charleston quit the show.

In February 2009, it was announced that a new generation of the Ramsay family would be introduced to the show. At the time, the Ramsays had not appeared in Neighbours for almost a decade. Executive producer Susan Bower said the introduction of the new Ramsay family members was based on the American drama series Party of Five. Paul Robinson's (Stefan Dennis) daughter Elle Robinson (Pippa Black) discovered that Max had a secret daughter with Paul's mother Anne. The affair was kept a secret due to the feud between their families, and Anne moved away with her daughter Jill Ramsay (Peri Cummings). As a result, Elle tracked down Jill and met her three children; Kate Ramsay (Ashleigh Brewer), Harry Ramsay (Will Moore) and Sophie Ramsay (Kaiya Jones). When Jill was killed in a hit and run accident, Kate, Harry and Sophie move to Ramsay Street and eventually become close with their uncle Paul. They lived at No. 24, like the original Ramsays, until it was sold off and Kate and Sophie moved in with Paul. Since then, all three have departed the soap. Charlene and Scott's son, Daniel Robinson (Tim Phillipps) was introduced on 29 April 2014. Two years later, his sister, Madison Robinson (Sarah Ellen), was introduced, and he was written out with his wife, Imogen Willis (Ariel Kaplan). In 2019, producers introduced Gemma Ramsay's (Beth Buchanan) daughter Roxy Willis (Zima Anderson), which leads to a short return for Gemma.

Family members

 Jack Ramsay; married an unknown woman
 Maud Ramsay; daughter of Jack
 Dan Ramsay; son of Jack; married Edna Wilkins
 Max Ramsay; son of Dan and Edna; married Maria Rossi 
 Jill Ramsay; daughter of Max and Anne Robinson
 Kate Ramsay; daughter of Jill and Patrick Mooney
 Harry Ramsay; son of Jill and Patrick
 Sophie Ramsay; daughter of Jill and Patrick 
 Shane Ramsay; son of Max and Maria
 Danny Ramsay; son of Maria and Tim Duncan; adopted by Max
 Tom Ramsay; son of Dan and Edna; married Doreen Leicester
 Moira Ramsay; daughter of Tom and Doreen; married to Mr. Harrigan
 Holly Harrigan; daughter of Moira and Mr Harrigan
 Gemma Ramsay; daughter of Tom and Doreen; married Adam Willis
 Roxy Willis; daughter of Gemma and Adam; married Kyle Canning
 Madge Ramsay; daughter of Dan and Edna; married Fred Mitchell; married Harold Bishop 
 Henry Ramsay; son of Madge and Fred; married to Bronwyn Davies
 Charlene Mitchell; daughter of Madge and Fred; married Scott Robinson
Daniel Robinson; son of Charlene and Scott; married Imogen Willis
 Madison Robinson; daughter of Charlene and Scott

Reception
In her book, Neighbours: The First 10 Years, Josephine Monroe observed that the Ramsays were "a good foil to the better bred Robinsons". The Sydney Morning Herald's Robin Oliver branded the family "raucous". Andrew Mercado, author of Super Aussie Soaps, believed the family were once "the backbone of the show". In her book Soap opera, Dorothy Hobson describes the family as "more working class than other characters" and stated: "They had working-class jobs but were not represented as cloth cap wearing or dowdy, they were bright and modern and representative of a vibrant and working population."

See also
Ramsay Street

References

Bibliography

Neighbours families
Television characters introduced in 1985
Ramsay family